The Cattle Thief's Escape is a 1913 American short silent Western film directed by and starring William Duncan. It co-stars Rex De Rosselli and Myrtle Stedman while Tom Mix appears in a supporting role. The film was produced by the Selig Polyscope Company and released through the General Film Company. It was released as split reel with Elephant as a Workman, Rangoon, India.

Cast
 William Duncan as Reverend John Morrison
 Rex De Rosselli as Joe Craig
 Myrtle Stedman as Rose Craig
 Lester Cuneo as Charley Pointer
 Tom Mix as Pete Becker, Half Breed
 Old Blue as Pete Becker's Horse (uncredited)

References

External links
 

1913 films
1913 Western (genre) films
1913 short films
American black-and-white films
American silent short films
Films directed by William Duncan
Lost American films
Selig Polyscope Company films
Silent American Western (genre) films
1910s American films